Bahzinah (also spelled Bahzina) is a village in northern Syria located west of Homs in the Homs Governorate. According to the Syria Central Bureau of Statistics, Bahzinah had a population of 586 in the 2004 census. Its inhabitants are predominantly Christians.

References

Populated places in Talkalakh District
Christian communities in Syria